The 1922–23 Swiss National Ice Hockey Championship was the 13th edition of the national ice hockey championship in Switzerland. EHC St. Moritz won the championship by defeating HC Rosey Gstaad in the final.

First round

Eastern Series 
EHC St. Moritz qualified for the final.

Western Series

Semifinals 
 HC La Chaux-de-Fonds - HC Château-d'Oex 0:8
 Lausanne HC - HC Rosey Gstaad 1:22

Final 
 HC Rosey Gstaad - HC Château-d'Oex 4:1

Final 
 EHC St. Moritz - HC Rosey Gstaad 3:0

External links 
Swiss Ice Hockey Federation – All-time results

National
Swiss National Ice Hockey Championship seasons